Pelmeni (—plural, ; pelmen,  —singular) are dumplings of Russian cuisine that consist of a filling wrapped in thin, unleavened dough. 

It is debated whether they originated in Ural or Siberia. Pelmeni have been described as "the heart of Russian cuisine".

Ingredients

The dough is made from flour and water, sometimes adding a small portion of eggs.

The filling can be minced meat (pork, lamb, beef, fish or any other kind of meat, venison being particularly traditional for colder regions) or mushrooms, or a combination of the two. The mixing together of different kinds of meat is also popular. The traditional Udmurt recipe requires a mixture of 45% beef, 35% mutton, and 20% pork. Various spices, such as black pepper and diced onions as well as garlic, are mixed into the filling. They are commonly topped with sour cream, mayonnaise, dill, red onions or vinegar, all of which are traditional to the region and can be produced in the Siberian climate.

Adding small amounts of cabbage, tomato and horseradish into the mince is also common for certain regional recipes.

Temperature and humidity have considerable impact on dough consistency and stability.

Origin and history
The first mention of a dish similar to dumplings comes from ancient Greece, but the Ural region seems to be the original homeland of pelmeni. The word pelmeni is derived from pel'n'an''' (пельнянь)—literally "ear bread" in the Finnic Komi and Udmurt languages. It is unclear when pelmeni entered the cuisines of the indigenous Siberian people and when they first appeared in Russian cuisine. One theory suggests pelmeni, or stuffed boiled dumplings in general, originated in Siberia. Pelmeni became especially popular among Russian hunters.

Pelmeni are a particularly good means of quickly preserving meat during the long Siberian winter, thereby eliminating the need to feed livestock during the long winter months. Thus, despite their Uralic origin, pelmeni were much influenced by the Siberian way of cooking.

Differences

Pelmeni belong to the family of dumplings, and are related to Ukrainian varenyky and Polish uszka. In the United States and Canada, the term pierogi or perogies is often used to describe all kinds of Eastern European dumplings, regardless of the shape, size, or filling. Pelmeni are also similar to Mongolian bansh, Chinese jiaozi (Cantonese gaau) or Chinese húntún (Cantonese wonton). They are cousins to the Armenian, Turkish and Kazakh manti, the Georgian khinkali, the Nepalese and Tibetan momo, the Uyghur and Uzbek chuchvara, the Korean mandu, the Japanese gyoza, the Italian tortellini and ravioli, and Swabian Maultaschen. Somewhat similar are the fried or baked empanadas encountered in Hispanic-influenced cultures.

The most important difference between pelmeni, varenyky, and pierogi is the thickness of the dough shell—in pelmeni and vareniki this is as thin as possible, and the proportion of filling to dough is usually higher. Pelmeni are never served with a sweet filling, which distinguishes them from vareniki and Polish pierogi, which sometimes are. Also, the fillings in pelmeni are usually raw, while the fillings of vareniki and pierogi are typically precooked.

Regional differences

In Siberia, pelmeni are traditionally frozen outdoors in the winter and treated as preserved food. Hunters or explorers heading into the taiga would carry sacks of frozen pelmeni with their provisions since they can be stored frozen for a long time and are easily cooked. 

Pelmeni are prepared immediately before eating by boiling in salted water until they float, and then two to five minutes more. In the Urals, they are boiled in plain water, while in Siberia they are boiled in salted water or sometimes meat or chicken broth. The cooked pelmeni are served alone or topped with melted butter or smetana (sour cream), as well as condiments like mustard, horseradish, tomato sauce, and vinegar. In the Russian Far East, they generally add soy sauce. 

Some recipes suggest frying pelmeni after boiling until they turn golden brown. Pelmeni can also be served in a clear soup, although in Siberia this is considered in poor taste and pelmeni are carefully strained before serving. In Tatar cuisine, pilmän (the Tatar equivalent of pelmeni) are a traditional dish, where they have always been served with clear soup and added dill or other freshly cut herbs. Pelmeni are also part of Polish cuisine.

Packed frozen, pelmeni can be found in ethnic Russian and Ukrainian food stores everywhere. Packets of frozen pelmeni, like those carried on the taiga, are usually labeled "Siberian pelmeni". Store-bought pelmeni are made on industrial machinery, much of which is made by Italian companies such as Arienti and Cattaneo, Ima, Ostoni, Zamboni, etc. These pelmeni usually weigh around  each and look like a larger version of tortellini, which is why, for industrial production, Italian pasta machines are commonly used. Pelmeni are also commonly made at home. The easiest (if somewhat laborious) way is simply to make them by hand; many cooks use specialized "pelmeni makers" (pelmennitsa''), which are essentially molds that resemble muffin pans or ravioli molds, allowing one to quickly make a few dozen pelmeni out of two sheets of dough and a quantity of ground meat.

In modern Russian, Belarusian and Ukrainian culture, store-bought pelmeni are considered a kind of convenience food associated with students' or bachelors' lifestyles, much like instant ramen, while home-made pelmeni are considered hearty, healthy food.

See also

 Kreplach
 Wonton
 List of dumplings
 List of Russian dishes

References

External links
 Pelmeni: Russian dumplings
 Pelmeni (Meat Dumplings)
 The American Way of Making Russian Pelmeni

Dumplings
National dishes
Pasta dishes
Russian cuisine
Siberian cuisine
Soviet cuisine
Types of pasta